Goris State University (GorSU) (Armenian: Գորիսի պետական համալսարան) is a university in Goris, Syunik Province, Armenia. With 4 faculties, it is the largest university in Syunik Province. It provides degrees in Philology, History and Geography, Pedagogy, Biology and Chemistry, and Physics and Mathematics. Currently, more than 2,000 students are attending the university.

Overview
The origins of the Goris State University trace back to the establishment of the Faculty of Pedagogy in Goris in 1967 as part of the Armenian State Pedagogical University based in Yerevan.

After 4 decades, upon the decision of the government of Armenia, Goris State University was formed in 2006 on the basis of the faculties of the National Polytechnic University of Armenia and the Armenian State Pedagogical University.

The current rector of the university is Dr. Yuri Safaryan

Faculties
As of 2017, the university is home to 4 faculties:

Faculty of Humanities
Section of Armenian Language and Literature
Section of Pedagogy
Section of History
Section of Law
Faculty of Natural Sciences
Section of Mathematics
Section of Chemistry
Section of Biology
Faculty of Engineering
Section of Industrial Electronics and Energy
Section of Physics and Engineering
Faculty of Economics
Section of Economics and Public Sciences
Section of Foreign Languages

References

Universities in Armenia
Educational institutions established in 1967
1967 establishments in Armenia